Miller Place Historic District is a national historic district located at Miller Place in Suffolk County, New York. The district contains 27 contributing buildings. It encompasses a concentration of the rural vernacular architecture characteristic of Long Island from the mid-18th through late 19th century. They are largely 1- to -story, wood-frame dwellings sheathed in clapboard or wood shingles. Also included is the Miller Place Academy building.

The Historic District spans from the William Miller Homestead on North Country Road (CR 20) at the west end, to just beyond the Vassilaros house, then turns northeast along Lower Rocky Point Road until it reaches Gully Landing Road to the east end. It was added to the National Register of Historic Places in 1976 and was the first national historic district in the Town of Brookhaven.

Gallery

References

External links
Miller Place Historic District (Living Places.com)
Miller Place Historic District (PopPhotos Forum.com)
History of Miller Place (Coastal Internet)
Miller Place-Mount Sinai Historical Society

Historic districts on the National Register of Historic Places in New York (state)
Federal architecture in New York (state)
Historic districts in Suffolk County, New York
National Register of Historic Places in Suffolk County, New York